Atlético Municipal is a Honduran football club based in Santa Cruz de Yojoa. The club currently plays in Liga Nacional de Ascenso de Honduras.

History
The club was established in August 1980. It was only the second team from the Second Division to beat Honduran giants Olimpia, 3–2 in 2011. During the 2017 Honduran Cup, the club reached the Round of 16 after eliminating the clear favorites Real C.D. España. On 4 July 2018, it was announced that the club decided to sell its franchise to Santos F.C.S., quoting financial hardship.

Achievements
Liga de Ascenso
Runners-up (2): 2011–12 A, 2012–13 A

Former managers
  Wilmer Cruz (2011 & 2012)

References

Defunct football clubs in Honduras
1980 establishments in Honduras
2018 disestablishments in Honduras
Association football clubs established in 1980
Association football clubs disestablished in 2018